Abdal Beygi Mohammadi (also Romanized as ‘Abdāl Beygī Moḥammadī; also known as Bāzvand Moḩammadī, ‘Abdāl Beygī and ‘Abdolbeygī) is a village in Bazvand Rural District, Central District, Rumeshkhan County, Lorestan Province, Iran. It lies north-east of Kahriz Gizhian. At the 2006 census, its population was 205, in 43 families.

References 

Populated places in Rumeshkhan County